Mohammad Siraj Uddin Ahmed is a Bangladeshi Jatiya Party politician and the former member of Parliament of Dhaka-5.

Career 
Siraj Uddin Ahmed was elected a Member of Parliament from Dhaka-5 constituency as an independent candidate in the fourth parliamentary elections of 1988 Bangladeshi general election. After that he joined Jatiya Party. He was defeated as an independent candidate in the fifth parliamentary elections of 1991.

References 

Living people
Year of birth missing (living people)
Jatiya Party (Ershad) politicians
4th Jatiya Sangsad members